Love Season is the debut studio album by jazz pianist Alex Bugnon. It was released in 1988 through Orpheus Records. Recording sessions took place at Presence Studios in East Haven, Connecticut, at Unique Studios, 39th Street Music Studio and Rawlston Recording Studio in New York City. The production was handled by Rahni Song, Poogie Bell and Victor Bailey with executive producer Beau Huggins. The album spawned three singles: "Piano in the Dark", "Going Out" and "Yearning for Your Love".

The album peaked at number 127 on the Billboard 200 and at number 34 on the Top R&B/Hip-Hop Albums chart in the United States. Its singles "Going Out" and "Yearning for Your Love" made it to #83 and #85 respectively on the Hot R&B/Hip-Hop Songs chart. Alex Bugnon received a nomination for Soul Train Music Award for Best Jazz Album in 1990 Soul Train Music Awards, but lost to Quincy Jones' Back on the Block.

Track listing 

 Notes

 Track 2 is a cover of "Piano in the Dark" originally recorded by Brenda Russell
 Track 5 is a cover of "Yearning for Your Love" originally recorded by The Gap Band

Personnel 

 Alex Bugnon – main artist, keyboards, synthesizer, synth bass, Yamaha grand piano, Fairlight drums, arranger, co-producer
 Kysia Bostic – backing vocals
 Rahni P. Harris, Jr. – backing vocals, electric bass, horns, percussion, koto, Fairlight programming, additional synthesizer, producer, engineering, arranger
 Victor Bailey – backing vocals, bass, arranger, producer
 Mark Ledford – backing vocals, trumpet, arranger
 Keith Robinson – guitar
 Michael ''Dino'' Campbell – guitar
 Charles "Poogie" Bell – drum programming, percussion, arranger, producer
 Randy Hutchinson – arranger
 LaVerne Blair – assistant producer
 Beau Huggins – executive producer
 Claude Achille – engineering
 Michael Finlayson – engineering
 Kurt Upper – mixing
 Mike Allaire – mixing
 Jack Skinner – mastering
 Henry Marquez – art direction
 Lu Ann Graffeo – design
 Robert Cohen – photography

Charts

References

External links 

 

1988 debut albums
Alex Bugnon albums